The 2021 JC Ferrero Challenger Open was a professional tennis tournament played on clay courts. It was the fourth edition of the tournament which was part of the 2021 ATP Challenger Tour. It took place in Alicante, Spain between 11 and 17 October 2021.

Singles main-draw entrants

Seeds

 1 Rankings are as of 4 October 2021.

Other entrants
The following players received wildcards into the singles main draw:
  Nicolás Álvarez Varona
  Feliciano López
  Emilio Nava

The following players received entry into the singles main draw as alternates:
  Lucas Miedler
  Nicolas Moreno de Alboran
  Vladyslav Orlov
  Mischa Zverev

The following players received entry from the qualifying draw:
  Sriram Balaji
  Georgii Kravchenko
  Santiago Rodríguez Taverna
  Denis Yevseyev

Champions

Singles

  Constant Lestienne def.  Hugo Grenier 6–4, 6–3.

Doubles

  Denys Molchanov /  David Vega Hernández def.  Romain Arneodo /  Matt Reid 6–4, 6–2.

References

2021 ATP Challenger Tour
2021 in Spanish tennis
October 2021 sports events in Spain